HMS Neptune was an ironclad turret ship originally designed and built in Britain for Brazil, but acquired for the Royal Navy in 1878. Modifications to suit the Royal Navy took three years to complete and the ship did not begin her first commission until 1883 with the Channel Fleet. She was transferred to the Mediterranean Fleet in 1885, but refitted in Portsmouth in 1886–87. Neptune then became the coastguard ship for the 1st Class Reserve at Holyhead until 1893 when she was placed in reserve in Portsmouth. She was scrapped in Germany in 1904.

Design and description

Adding masts, however, meant adding a forecastle at the bow and a poop deck at the stern to provide the space required for the masts and rigging. These blocked the firing arcs of the gun turrets so that they were deprived of the axial fire which was the original design's greatest virtue.

During the Russo-Turkish War of 1877–78 tensions dramatically escalated between Russia and Great Britain as the latter feared that the victorious Russian armies would occupy the Turkish capital of Constantinople, something that the British were not prepared to tolerate. They mobilized much of the Royal Navy in case war did break out and purchased a number of ironclads under construction, including Independencia, in 1878. The Brazilians sold the ship for £600,000, nearly twice as much as the £370,000 paid for Devastation a few years earlier. Another £89,172 was spent to bring her up to the standards of the Royal Navy. In British service she was deemed "a white elephant, being a thoroughly bad ship in most respects—unlucky, full of inherent faults and small vices, and at times a danger to her own consorts".

Neptune proved a poor seakeeper as she was wet, difficult to manoeuvre and a heavy roller. She had a  skylight over the wardroom, which as a result often flooded while the ship was at sea.

Propulsion
Neptune had one 2-cylinder trunk steam engine, made by John Penn and Sons, driving a single  propeller. The ship carried  of coal, enough to steam  at  even though Sir George Tryon described her as "a weak ship in her engines and consuming a coal-mine daily".

Neptune was barque-rigged, but her twin funnels were so close to the mainmast that the sails and rigging rapidly deteriorated in service. The mast was eventually stripped of sails and yards so that the ship only used the fore and mizzen masts; an unsightly combination described as "like a half-dressed harlot". During her 1886 refit the ship's masts and rigging were replaced by simple pole masts with fighting tops at the fore and mizzen positions only.

Armament
The Brazilians had ordered four Whitworth  for the gun turrets and a pair of  breech-loading guns as chase guns, but these were replaced in British service. HMS Neptune mounted a pair of  muzzle-loading rifles in each turret and two  rifled muzzle-loading guns in the forecastle as chase guns. These guns only traverse 45° to the side. The ship also had six 20-pounder Armstrong guns for use as saluting guns. Two  torpedo tubes were mounted on the main deck, one on each side, for Whitehead torpedoes.

It was credited with the nominal ability to penetrate  armour.

Armour
The chase guns at the bow were protected by a patch of  armour.

The armoured deck was  outside the citadel and 2 inches thick inside it. Neptune was provided with a conning tower protected by 6–8 inches of armour situated right in front of the foremast. It could "be regarded as the first adequately installed conning position installed in a British" ironclad.

Service
HMS Neptune was laid down in 1873 for the Brazilian Navy under the name of Independencia by J & W Dudgeon in Cubitt Town, London. The shipyard attempted to launch her on 16 July 1874, but she stuck fast and did not budge. A second attempt was made on 30 July during which the ship got about one-third down the slipway and stuck, extensively damaging her bottom plating. She was finally launched on 10 September, after she had been lightened, and she was towed to Samuda Brothers for repairs and fitting out. The cost of the accident resulted in the bankruptcy of Dudgeons in 1875.

Independencia ran her sea trials in December 1877. On 22 December, she ran aground in the River Thames at Greenwich, Kent. She was refloated on 25 December and towed in to Greenhithe, Kent. Independencia was run into by the British steamship Firebrick at Greenhithe, Kent on 23 February 1878 and sustained slight damage. She was purchased by the Royal Navy in March 1878 and renamed Neptune, after the Roman god of the sea. She was then taken to Portsmouth for alterations to her armament and other equipment that took until 3 September 1881 to complete.

Neptune was commissioned on 28 March 1883 for service with the Channel Fleet. She was transferred to the Mediterranean Fleet in 1885, but returned to Portsmouth in July 1886 for a refit. The ship was assigned as the guard ship for the 1st Class Reserve at Holyhead in May 1887. Neptune paid off into reserve in November 1893 in Portsmouth. In April 1902 she was transferred from Fleet reserve to Dockyard Reserve. The ship was sold for £18,000 on 15 September 1903 for scrap.

While under tow by the tug Rowland and another at her side out of Portsmouth on 23 October 1903, Neptune broke the cables connecting her to the tugs in a storm. With the winds and a strong flood tide pushing her, she was pushed back into the harbour and narrowly missed the training tender of the Royal Naval College, Osborne, . Neptune then was pushed by the tides and winds toward  and came to rest against the bow ram of Hero. She was finally broken up in Lemwerder, Germany, in 1904.

Footnotes

References

External links

 HMS Neptune Photo Gallery

 

Battleships of the Royal Navy
Ships built in Cubitt Town
1874 ships
Victorian-era battleships of the United Kingdom
Maritime incidents in July 1874
Maritime incidents in December 1877